Suresh Bansal (31 January 1943 – 29 January 2022) was an Indian politician and a member of the 16th Legislative Assembly of Uttar Pradesh of India. He represented the Ghaziabad constituency of Uttar Pradesh and was a member of the Bahujan Samaj Party political party.

Early life and education
Suresh Bansal was born in Ghaziabad. He attended the Meerut College & Dr. Bhimrao Ambedkar University and attained Master in Science degree.

Political career
Bansal was a MLA for one term. He represented the Ghaziabad constituency and was a member of the Bahujan Samaj Party political party.

He lost his seat in the 2017 Uttar Pradesh Assembly election to Atul Garg of the Bharatiya Janata Party.

Death 
Bansal died from COVID-19 at a hospital in Kaushambi, Ghaziabad, on 29 January 2022, at the age of 78.

Posts held

See also
 Ghaziabad
 Sixteenth Legislative Assembly of Uttar Pradesh
 Uttar Pradesh Legislative Assembly

References 

1943 births
2022 deaths
Bahujan Samaj Party politicians from Uttar Pradesh
Deaths from the COVID-19 pandemic in India
Politicians from Ghaziabad
Uttar Pradesh MLAs 2012–2017